The Marshua Stakes is an American Thoroughbred horse race held annually in February at Laurel Park Racecourse in Laurel, Maryland. The race is open to three-year-old fillies and is run at six furlongs on the dirt.

An ungraded stakes race, it offers a purse of $100,000. The race was named in honor of the great race mare Marshua in 1987. Marshua was foaled in 1962 and was an American Thoroughbred racehorse sired by Nashua out of Emardee, by Heliopolis. Marshua was ranked second in her class of two-year-olds. She made 16 starts in 1964 and was in the money 15 times, or 94% of the time. The highlight of that season was her victory in the prestigious Selima Stakes at Laurel Park Racecorse in Maryland. Having led all the way around the  mile event, she battled Queen Empress through the stretch to win by a fading neck. Queen Empress was later named champion two-year-old filly. In addition to the Selima, Marshua won the Schuylerville Stakes, the Gardenia Stakes and the Marguerite Stakes in her freshman year.

Marshua was bred and owned by Mrs. Wallace Gilroy. At age three, she placed second in the Acorn Stakes and won the filly classic Coaching Club American Oaks. She retired with a record of nine wins, six seconds and four thirds in 21 starts with career earnings of $317,599.

Records 

Speed record: 
 6 furlongs - 1:09.36 - Gator Prowl   (2010) 
 7 furlongs - 1:24.60 - Mary's Silver Pen   (2000)

Most wins by a horse:
 No horse has ever won the Marshua Stakes more than once.

Most wins by an owner:
 No owner has ever won the Marshua Stakes more than once.

Most wins by a jockey:
 3 - Jeremy Rose    (2007, 2008 & 2009)
 3 - Mario Pino    (1994, 2000 & 2004)

Most wins by a trainer:
 2 - Dale Capuano    (2005 & 2006)
 2 - Edmund D. Gaudet  (1990 & 2007)

Winners of the Marshua Stakes since 1987

See also 
 Marshua Stakes top three finishers
 Laurel Park Racecourse

References

External links
 Laurel Park website

Recurring events established in 1987
Laurel Park Racecourse
Horse races in Maryland
Recurring sporting events established in 1987